Marcos Siega (born June 8, 1969, in New York City) is a film, television, commercial and music video director. He has also worked as a producer, a musician and an artist.

In the late 1980s, he helped to form the New York-based punk band Bad Trip, releasing two full-length records and numerous EPs. When he began directing music videos, many bands and musicians noted that Siega's background in rock music was beneficial. He has worked with bands such as Weezer, System of a Down, P.O.D., Papa Roach, Blink-182 and The All-American Rejects. His 2000 video for Blink-182's "All the Small Things" earned him three MTV Video Music Award nominations and he was nominated for a Grammy Award for his Papa Roach video "Broken Home". In 2001, he signed with the award-winning commercial production company Hungryman Films and moved into the spot world.

Siega went on to direct films and acclaimed television series such as Dexter, True Blood, Cold Case and Veronica Mars. In 2008, he directed the pilot and co-executive produced The Vampire Diaries which ran for eights seasons on the CW Network. Siega also directed the pilots and was executive producer of The Following, Charlie's Angels, Time after Time, The Passage and God Friended Me.

Pretty Persuasion, the 2005 film he directed, was nominated for a Grand Jury Prize at the Sundance Film Festival and won the German Independence Award at the Oldenburg International Film Festival.

Siega married Lisa Goldsmith in 2001. They have three children and live in New York. The family also had a home in the Sunset Strip section of Los Angeles which was sold in November 2010.

Filmography
Stung (1999)
Pretty Persuasion (2005)
Underclassman (2005)
Chaos Theory (2008)

Television director
Rock the House (2002) several episodes
Fastlane (2002) – two episodes
Oliver Beene (2003)
Veronica Mars (2004) – three episodes
Cold Case (2005) – several episodes
Eyes (2005)
Life (2007)
Shark (2007) – several episodes
The Nine (2007)
Traveler (2007)
True Blood Episode 7 (2008)
Dexter (2008) – several episodes
October Road (2008)
The Vampire Diaries (2009) – pilot and several episodes
Outlaw (2010) – multiple episodes
Charlie's Angels (2011) – pilot and several episodes
The Following (2012 to 2015) – Pilot & Multiple episodes
Blindspot (2015 to 2016) – several episodes
Time After Time (2017) - several episodes
You (2018) - multiple episodes
God Friended Me (2018 to 2020) - several episodes
The Passage (2019) - pilot
Batwoman (2019) - pilot
The Lost Boys (2020)
The Flight Attendant (2020) - several episodes
Dexter: New Blood (2021-2022) - several episodes

Music videos

311 – "Flowing"
8stops7 – "Question Everything"
The Actual – "Worst Day of My Life"
Alien Ant Farm – "Movies"
The All-American Rejects – "Swing, Swing" and "Dirty Little Secret"
Aimee Allen – "Revolution"
Amanda – "Everybody Doesn't"
Anastacia – "Boom"
Anthrax – "Inside Out", "Fueled" and "Nothing"
BBMak – "Still on Your Side"
Bif Naked – "Moment of Weakness"
Birdbrain – "Youth of America"
Blink-182 – "All the Small Things", "What's My Age Again?" and "Man Overboard"
Tracy Bonham – "Sunshine"
Buckcherry – "Ridin'"
Chantal Kreviazuk – "Before You"
Chokebore – "A Taste for Bitters"
CIV – "Can't Wait One Minute More"
Collective Soul – "Why, Pt. 2"
Corrosion of Conformity – "Drowning in a Daydream"
The Crystal Method – "Name of the Game" and "You Know It's Hard" (featuring Scott Weiland)
Cypress Hill featuring Roni Size – "Child of the West"
Disney Channel Circle of Stars featuring Hilary Duff and Raven-Symoné – "Circle of Life"
Eels – "Mr. E.'s Beautiful Blues"
Eve 6 – "Promise" and "Here's to the Night"
Everclear – "Rock Star"
Goldfinger – "More Today Than Yesterday"
Hoku – "Perfect Day"
Hoobastank – "Crawling in the Dark"
Ill Niño – "What Comes Around"
Jars of Clay – "Unforgetful You"
Jurassic 5 – "The Influence"
Kelly Osbourne – "Papa Don't Preach"
Kittywider – "Crazy Weed"
Lifehouse – "Sick Cycle Carousel" and "Breathing"
The Living End – "Roll On"
Mest – "Cadillac"
Our Lady Peace – "Life"
P.O.D. – "Rock the Party (Off the Hook)", "Southtown" and "Satellite"
Papa Roach – "Last Resort" and "Broken Home"
Paramore – "That's What You Get"
Pete Yorn – "Strange Condition"
Peter Searcy – "Losing Light Fast"
Quicksand – "Delusional" and "Thorn in My Side"
Rival Schools – "Used for Glue"
Rooney – "Blueside" and "Pop Stars"
Sara Bareilles – "Bottle It Up"
Scapegoat Wax – "Lost Cause"
Sevendust – "Waffle"
Shades Apart – "Tainted Love"
Shift – "In Honor of Myself"
Smoother – "East Side"
SR-71 – "Right Now"
Stem – "Pinch"
The Suicide Machines – "Sometimes I Don't Mind"
System of a Down – "Chop Suey!" and "Toxicity"
Tantric – "Breakdown"
Third Day – "You Make Me Mad"
Toad the Wet Sprocket – "Come Down"
Trickside – "Under You"
Trik Turner – "Friends & Family"
Trust Company – "Downfall"
Ünloco – "Facedown"
The Urge – "Too Much Stereo"
Vanessa Carlton – "Pretty Baby"
Weezer – "Island in the Sun (Version 1)", "Hash Pipe", "Beverly Hills", "Dope Nose" and "Keep Fishin'"
will.i.am – "Will I Am"

Film and television as producer or executive producer
Stung (1999)
Rock the House (2002)
Pretty Persuasion (2005)
Drive-Thru (2007)
Barry Munday (2008)
The Vampire Diaries (2009–11)
Outlaw (2010)
Charlie's Angels (2011)
The Following (2013–15)
Blindspot (2015)
You (2018)
God Friended Me (2018)
The Passage (2019)
Batwoman (2019)

References

External links
 

1969 births
American music video directors
American television directors
Film directors from New York City
Living people